Gamma Phi Beta (also known as GPhi or Gamma Phi) is an international college sorority. It was founded in Syracuse University in 1874, and was the first of the Greek organizations to call itself a sorority.  The term "sorority"  was coined for Gamma Phi Beta by Dr. Frank Smalley, a professor at Syracuse University.

The sorority's international headquarters are located in Centennial, Colorado. As of 2016, Gamma Phi Beta listed more than 200,000 initiated members, 130 chartered collegiate chapters and more than 155 alumnae groups in the United States and Canada.

Early History
Colleges and universities admitted few women students in the 1870s. Erastus Otis Haven, Syracuse University chancellor and former president of the University of Michigan and Northwestern University instead maintained that women should receive the advantages of higher education and enrolled his daughter, Frances, at Syracuse.

Founders
Frances Haven and three friends organized their own society. Gamma Phi Beta Society was subsequently founded on November 11, 1874, at Syracuse University by:
Helen M. Dodge
Frances E. Haven
E. Adeline Curtis
Mary A. Bingham.
 
The founders had originally selected light blue as the official color but changed it in 1875 to brown and mode (dark and light brown). The society's first initiate, Clara Worden, joined in March 1875.

For its first several years Gamma Phi Beta was simply known as a society; it had never used the term fraternity. It was the first of the national women's organizations to adopt the word "sorority", coined in 1882 on behalf of the Syracuse chapter by one of the Latin professors on the faculty. From 1882 the organization was known as Gamma Phi Beta Sorority.

Gamma Phi Beta is a member of the Syracuse Triad, the name given to the three women's sororities founded at Syracuse University. Alpha Phi was founded first in 1872 by 10 of the original 20 women admitted into Syracuse University. Gamma Phi Beta came along two years later in 1874 and Alpha Gamma Delta completed the triad in 1904. Syracuse Triad ceremonies or events are held on most campuses with chapters of all three groups.

Expansion and Later History
Gamma Phi Beta expanded slowly at first. The sorority's second chapter, Beta chapter at the University of Michigan was placed in 1882, followed in 1885 by Gamma chapter at Wisconsin. Over the next ten years, the sorority expanded into the Midwest and to eastern schools.  In 1894 Gamma Phi Beta expanded to the West Coast, to the University of California and at Washington, Oregon and Idaho.

Gamma Phi Beta's first convention was held in Syracuse in 1883, with annual sessions held until 1907. After that year, conventions became biennial, offset with a Leadership Training School held in the off-convention years.

In 1891, Gamma Phi Beta joined the National Panhellenic Conference's (NPC) as a founding member.

The crest, of coat of arms, of Gamma Phi Beta was adopted after a national crest design competition following the 1915 Convention. The winning crest was designed by Gertrude Comfort Morrow (California-Berkeley, 1913). In 1965 the use of color was officially included in the crest.

Frances E. Haven went on to assist in founding Omicron chapter at the University of Illinois in 1913. Omicron is the only other chapter established by one of the original founders.

In 1919 establishment of Alpha Alpha chapter at the University of Toronto, in Canada, made the sorority international.

Symbols
Gamma Phi Beta's symbol is the crescent moon.
Its flower is the pink carnation. 
The official colors of Gamma Phi Beta have long been pink and shades of brown. At first, designated by "Brown and Mode", brown to honor Dr. John J. Brown's role at the sorority's founding, along with 'mode', meant as any stylish and complementary color of the day. In 2006 an extensive re-branding effort adopted updates to several of the symbols used along with the society's colors.  The "primary pallet" of  "Blush" (pink) and  "A-la-Mode" (brown/gray) is now explained:
"To modernize our meaningful colors, we lightened the pink to blush and combined light brown with warm gray, creating a shade we call A-La-Mode. The updated colors exude femininity and strength; they are timeless and confident like our membership."
Secondary colors were chosen and are listed as  Once in A Blue Moon,  Pearl,  Brownstone and  Carnation. The branding page explains these as "...the perfect accessories to our primary palette." 

The carnation was named the official flower at Convention 1888, while pink was designated the official color of the carnation in 1950. Carnations have been revered for more than 2,000 years as one of the most long-lasting flowers. Many varieties produce a clove-like scent, and the aroma is said to be both uplifting and motivating.

The open motto is "Founded on a Rock".

The Gamma Phi Beta crest, or coat of arms is in the shape of a shield featuring three pink carnations on a white background, an open book on a light brown background, and a waxing crescent moon on dark brown background. The crest is only to be worn by initiated members.

The Gamma Phi Beta badge has not significantly changed since its design in 1874. It was designed by Tiffany & Co. It features a black crescent moon cradling the Greek letters, Gamma, Phi and Beta.  Badges are currently produced by jeweler Herff Jones with customization options such as a gold or silver finish or adding jewels.

The badges worn by International Council members are larger and feature white crescent moons instead of black.  The international president's badge is set with diamonds on the Greek letters; other international officers' badges are set with pearls. In 1902, a triangular-shaped shield of dark brown on which rests a crescent of gold was approved as the badge for uninitiated new members.

Philanthropy and community service
Gamma Phi Beta provided humanitarian supplies during both WWI and WWII.  Donation containers were placed throughout the United States by chapters, with the funds collected directed at the end of WWI to the relief of French war orphans.

In 1929, camping for girls was designated the official philanthropy of Gamma Phi Beta, leading to support of Camp Fire and Girl Guides of Canada.

In WWII, funds were raised that supported a Mobile Canteen for Great Britain, and contributions were raised for the American Red Cross, the Queen's Canadian Fund for air raid victims throughout Great Britain, and the Army and Navy Relief Societies. Its War bonds drive campaign resulted in four drives that raised $14M, earning the sorority two U.S. Treasury citations for distinguished service rendered on behalf of the War Finance Program.

At Convention 2012, a new philanthropic focus was adopted: "to provide experiences and resources that build spiritual, mental and social resiliency in girls" and the sorority partnered with Girls on the Run. The official philanthropy of Gamma Phi Beta is Building Strong Girls. Gamma Phi Beta's current philanthropic focus is, "We are women building strong girls."

Membership
Every initiated member has a lifelong membership in Gamma Phi Beta and may participate in alumnae activities on the local, regional and international level. Women who have never been initiated to a National Panhellenic Conference sorority may be eligible to join Gamma Phi Beta through the alumnae initiate program. Once a woman is initiated into Gamma Phi Beta, she is no longer allowed to join any other National Panhellenic Conference sorority. One standard of membership is paying dues each semester during a member's college years and, once she graduates, paying a yearly due to International Headquarters.

Chapters

Notable alumnae
Arts
Birgitta Moran Farmer (Alpha) – Painter

Education
Karen Holbrook (Gamma) – Past president of Ohio State University.

Entertainment
Kristin Chenoweth (Beta Omicron) – Tony Award and Emmy Award winning actress.
Meagan Holder (Delta Delta) – Actress (You Again and Bring It On: Fight to the Finish)
Heather McDonald (Beta Alpha) – Actress, comedian, writer best known for Chelsea Lately.
Elizabeth Pitcairn (Beta Alpha) – Famous concert violinist, plays the famous violin on which the Academy Award winning film, The Red Violin was based.
Bailey Hanks (Zeta Zeta) – Broadway actress (Legally Blonde).
Susan Howard (Alpha Zeta) – Actress (Dallas).
Cloris Leachman (Epsilon) – Actress, Academy Award winner.
Kelli O'Hara (Beta Omicron) – Actress, Tony Award winner for The King and I.
Kelli McCarty (Beta Chi) – Actress, model, Miss USA 1991
Mary Beth Peil (Epsilon) – Tony Award nominated singer and actress (Dawson's Creek).
Hope Summers (Epsilon) – Actress (The Andy Griffith Show).

Government
Jocelyn Burdick (Epsilon) – North Dakota governor appointed her to US Senate seat held by her late husband in 1992.
Lane Carlson (Alpha Delta) – Former head of Public Affairs of US Army; First woman to be named full colonel in Army (1968).
Laurel Clark (Gamma) – NASA Astronaut on the space shuttle Columbia.
Jeannie Deakyne (Alpha Epsilon) – Mrs. U.S. Beauties 2008, Mrs. Texas International 2005 and Bronze Star Medal recipient.
Jennifer Dunn (Lambda) – Former U.S. Congresswoman ('93–'05) – WA 8th District.
Lynn Morley Martin (Omicron) – Secretary of Labor under President Bush.

Media
Carol Ryrie Brink (Xi) – Author of Caddie Woodlawn and winner of the Newbery Medal in 1936.
Alex Flanagan (Alpha Epsilon) – Sports reporter for ESPN, NFL Network, and NBC.
Marguerite Higgins (Eta) – UC Berkeley, Pulitzer Prize winner in 1951.

Sports
Lauren Sinclair (Delta Omega) – United States Sailing Team Member, Olympic Sailing Campaigner and ISAF World Cup of Sailing Participant.
Caroline Casey (Alpha Chi) – Keeper at Sky Blue FC, Piscataway Township, New Jersey

Facilities
Many Gamma Phi Beta chapters have on-campus housing for members. Housing may be run by the Gamma Phi Beta national organization or an alumna-run local Affiliated Housing Corporation. Several Gamma Phi Beta sorority houses are registered as historical homes, including:

 The Gamma Phi Beta Sorority House at the University of Illinois at Urbana–Champaign in Urbana, Illinois
 The Gamma Phi Beta Sorority House at the University of Oregon in Eugene, Oregon

See also
List of social fraternities and sororities

References

External links
 Gamma Phi Beta/Gamma Phi Beta International

 
1874 establishments in New York (state)
National Panhellenic Conference
Student societies in the United States
Syracuse University
Centennial, Colorado
Student organizations established in 1874